Christchurch  was a parliamentary electorate in Christchurch, New Zealand. It existed three times. Originally it was the Town of Christchurch from 1853 to 1860. From the 1860–1861 election to the 1871 election, it existed as City of Christchurch. It then existed from the 1875–1876 election until the 1881 election. The last period was from the 1890 election to the 1905 election. Since the 1946 election, a similarly named electorate called Christchurch Central has been in existence.

The historic electorate was represented by 21 members of parliament. For some of the time, it was represented by one member at a time. During other periods, it was one of the few three-member electorates in New Zealand.

Population centres
In December 1887, the House of Representatives voted to reduce its membership from general electorates from 91 to 70. The 1890 electoral redistribution used the same 1886 census data used for the 1887 electoral redistribution. In addition, three-member electorates were introduced in the four main centres. This resulted in a major restructuring of electorates, and Christchurch was one of eight electorates to be re-created for the 1890 election. The electorate included Christchurch City, Hagley Park, the boroughs of Sydenham and St Albans, and parts of the Linwood borough.

History

1853 to 1871
The nomination meeting for the first election was held on 16 August 1853 at the Christchurch Land Office, together with the nomination meeting for the Christchurch Country electorate. The first election was held on Saturday, 20 August between 9 am and 4 pm at the Resident Magistrate's Office in Christchurch, with Charles Simeon acting as the returning officer.

At the nomination meeting on 31 January 1861, John Cracroft Wilson was proposed by William Wilson and seconded by William Thomson. Cracroft Wilson was declared elected unopposed.

From 1853 to 1871, the electorate was represented by one member at a time. Prior to the 1860/61 election, it was known as Town of Christchurch:

1875 to 1881
The electorate was recreated for the 1875 election and existed for two terms until the 1881 election as a three-member electorate.

The nomination meeting for the 1875 election was held on 16 December. The former member of the Legislative Council, George Leslie Lee, was the returning officer. Edward Richardson, who had previously represented Christchurch West, was nominated by Louis Edward Nathan and seconded by Edward Bishop. Edward Cephas John Stevens, who had previously represented , was nominated John Inglis and seconded by William Derisley Wood. Samuel Paull Andrews was nominated by Henry Wynn-Williams and seconded by Daniel Reese. William Sefton Moorhouse was nominated by Fred Hobbs and seconded by William Wilson. Jerningham Wakefield put his own name forward, and he was seconded by James Treadwell. The latter was in turn proposed by J. R. Johnson and seconded by J. S. Buxton. The election was held on 21 December, and Stevens, Richardson, and Moorhouse were returned with 1059, 992, and 662 votes, respectively. Andrews, Wakefield, and Treadwell received 532, 241, and 22 votes, respectively. Historian George Macdonald said of Treadwell that "he was not taken seriously and there was no reason why he should be".

George Grey was elected in both the Thames and the City of Christchurch electorates in September 1879. Grey came first in the three-member Christchurch electorate (Samuel Paull Andrews and Edward Stevens came second with equal numbers of votes, and only 23 votes ahead of Edward Richardson). Richardson petitioned against Grey's return on technical grounds, as Grey had already been elected in the Thames electorate. The electoral commission unseated Grey on 24 October, with Richardson offered to fill this vacancy a few days later. Grey kept the Thames seat and remained a member of parliament through that constituency.

1890 to 1905
From 1890 until the 1905 election, it was a three-member electorate again. Six candidates stood for election in : William Pember Reeves (2784 votes), Westby Perceval (2721 votes), Richard Molesworth Taylor (2614 votes), John Tippett Smith (1811 votes), Edward Wingfield Humphreys (1666 votes) and Eden George (119 votes). Reeves, Perceval and Taylor were thus elected.

The 1896 by-election was caused by the appointment of William Pember Reeves as Agent-General.

Key:

Election results

1901 by-election

1899 election

 
 
 
 
 
 
 
 
 

 
 

Table footnotes:

1896 election

 
 
 
 
 
 
 
 
 
 
 
 
 
 
 

Table footnotes:

1896 by-election

1893 election

1891 by-election

1879 election

 
 
 
 
 

b Grey was unseated after a petition as he had already been elected in the  electorate

1875 election

1867 by-election

1860 by-election

1853 election

Notes

References

1905 disestablishments in New Zealand
Historical electorates of New Zealand
History of Christchurch
Politics of Christchurch
1853 establishments in New Zealand
1890 establishments in New Zealand
1881 disestablishments in New Zealand